"Hello (I Love You)" is a song performed by former Pink Floyd member Roger Waters. The song was created as a collaborative effort with Howard Shore for the 2007 film The Last Mimzy.

Overview
As Waters stated, "I think together we've come up with a song that captures the themes of the movie – the clash between humanity's best and worst instincts, and how a child's innocence can win the day".

Waters performed vocals and the bass for the song. The song itself contains references to the Pink Floyd albums The Wall and The Dark Side of the Moon, as well as Waters' solo album Radio K.A.O.S..

Music video
The song's music video features images from the film as well as recording sessions with Waters, Shore, producer James Guthrie and actress Rhiannon Leigh Wryn.

References

Roger Waters songs
Songs written by Roger Waters
2007 songs
Songs about children